Latvia's Bandy Federation (Latvijas Bendija Federācija) is the governing body for bandy and rink bandy in Latvia. Its headquarters is in Mārupe. Latvia's Bandy Federation was founded in 2006 and became a member in Federation of International Bandy the same year.

National team

References

Link
 https://web.archive.org/web/20100330165617/http://bandy.lv/

Bandy in Latvia
Bandy governing bodies
Federation of International Bandy members